Paul Gehrmann (born 28 April 1995) is a German footballer who plays as a midfielder.

References

External links
 
 

1995 births
Living people
People from Zwickau
Footballers from Saxony
German footballers
Association football midfielders
Goslarer SC 08 players
FC Energie Cottbus players
3. Liga players
Regionalliga players